Patricia Ann Brake (25 June 1942 – 28 May 2022) was an English actress. She was best known for her role as Ingrid Fletcher, the daughter of Norman Stanley Fletcher, in the BBC sitcom Porridge, and its sequel Going Straight.

Early life 
Brake was born in Bath on 25 June 1942, the daughter of Victor Brake, a butcher, and Doreen Brake (née Wilkey). She was educated at the City of Bath Girls' School, and beginning at age 16, she trained at the Bristol Old Vic Theatre School, before joining the Salisbury Playhouse for two years, from 1960 to 1961. She moved then to Harrogate for a year, where she was a member of the White Rose Players.

Career 
She joined the Royal Shakespeare Company where (among other roles) she played Hermia in a production of A Midsummer Night's Dream, directed by Peter Hall, which also featured Judi Dench, Diana Rigg, Ian Richardson and Ian Holm. This was followed by a period in the West End. She began appearing on television in such series as Emergency – Ward 10, No Hiding Place and A Sharp Intake of Breath with David Jason, and also had film roles in My Lover, My Son (1970), The Optimists of Nine Elms (1973).

Brake played Ingrid Fletcher, the daughter of Norman Stanley Fletcher, in the BBC sitcom Porridge, and its sequel Going Straight. In 2015, she guest-starred in the BBC ongoing drama Casualty and in Midsomer Murders for ITV. Alongside her extensive body of work in West End theatres, she also appeared in UK soaps EastEnders and Coronation Street and with many British comic actors in numerous situation comedies and one-off plays and Love/Loss (2010).

Personal life 
Brake married actor Robert McBain in 1966. They had two children and divorced in 1978. She married Michael Kennedy in 1997, gaining three stepchildren; he died in 2011. Brake died from cancer on 28 May 2022, one month before her 80th birthday.

Acting roles

References

External links

1942 births
2022 deaths
20th-century English actresses
21st-century English actresses
Actresses from Somerset
Alumni of Bristol Old Vic Theatre School
English television actresses
People from Bath, Somerset